VK Primorac Kotor is a professional water polo club based in Kotor, Montenegro. As of 2021–22 season, it competes in the Montenegrin League and Regional League A1.

History
In 2009, Primorac won the EuroLeague after defeating Pro Recco. In 2010, they finished as runner-ups against Pro Recco.

Current squad

  Aleksandro Kralj
  Vuk Drašković
  Aljoša Mačić
  Djordjije Stanojević  
  Alen Isljamović
  Dušan Matković 
  Marko Gopćević 
   Draško Šekarić
   Nedjo Baštrica
   Dragoljub Ćetković 
   Balša Nikolić
   Balša Vučković
   Jakov Bulajić
   Miloš Vukšić
   Mlađan Janović
   Pavle Krivokapić

Coach  
 Vido Lompar
   Sandro Sukno
   Miodrag Matković

Famous players

 Veljko Uskoković
 Nikola Janović
 Mlađan Janović
 Zvonimir Milošević (Zvonko Milošević)
 Draško Brguljan
    Gergely Kiss
 Darko Brguljan
 Ranko Perović
 Zdravko Radić
        Tony Azevedo
 Zoran Gopčević
 Vjekoslav Pasković
 Mirko Vičević
    Ádám Steinmetz
 Srđan Barba
 Filip Trajković
 Nebojša Milić
    Anđelo Šetka
 Nenad Vukanić

   Trifun Miro Ćirković
Notable former coaches
 Ranko Perović

Recent seasons

Rankings in Montenegrin First League

In European competition
Participations in Champions League (Euroleague): 11x
Participations in Euro Cup (LEN Cup): 10x

References

Water polo clubs in Montenegro